The Haida Gwaii black bear (Ursus americanus carlottae), also known as the Queen Charlotte Islands black bear, is a morphologically distinct subspecies of the American black bear. The most significant morphological differences are its large size, massive cranium and large molars. This subspecies is endemic to the Haida Gwaii (formerly the Queen Charlotte Islands) and is considered a "keystone species" because of the bears' transportation of salmon remains into the surrounding forests of the Haida Gwaii.

References

American black bears
Haida Gwaii
Carnivorans of North America
Mammals of Canada
Natural history of British Columbia
Endemic fauna of British Columbia
Endemic fauna of Canada